Bird and Fish is a public art work by artist Gustav Bohland, located on the south side of Milwaukee, Wisconsin. The bronze sculpture depicts a seagull and large fish in a struggle over a smaller fish. The artwork is located at the former corporate headquarters of Froedtert Malting Company which is now the US headquarters of MaltEurop.

See also
 The Sower
 The Reaper

References

1948 sculptures
Animal sculptures in Wisconsin
Bronze sculptures in Wisconsin
Fish in art
Outdoor sculptures in Milwaukee
Sculptures of birds in the United States
Statues in Wisconsin